The  was a private development Nakajima Aircraft Company after its failure to meet the 1935 requirement issued by the Japanese government for a modern single-seat monoplane fighter with the Ki-11 design.

Design & Development
Design work on the Ki-12 was a collaboration between engineers Roger Robert and Jean Beziaud from the French Dewoitine firm and Shigenobu Mori, a Nakajima engineer, and was heavily influenced by the Dewoitine D.510 design. Nakajima wanted the new design to be the most technically advanced in Japan.
Based on the Ki-11 airframe, the engine was replaced by a liquid-cooled  Hispano-Suiza 12Xcrs V engine. The landing gear were fully retractable (the first Japanese design to have this feature), and the design introduced the use of slotted flaps. Proposed armament consisted of a 20 mm cannon firing from between the engine cylinders and twin 7.7 mm (.303 in) machine guns.

The Ki-12 was tested against the Mitsubishi Ki-18. Although technically advanced and with advantages in speed, range and firepower over the other contemporary Japanese fighter designs, the Ki-12 was deemed too heavy and complex by the Imperial Japanese Army Air Force. The IJAAF also felt that the design was lacking in maneuverability, and would not want to rely on the manufacturing licence for the Hispano-Suiza engine.

Although the Army declined to pursue the project, Nakajima continued to refine the design, introducing a simpler version styled the Nakajima Type P.E., which evolved into the successful Ki-27 "Nate" several years later.

Variants
 Nakajima Ki-12: initial prototype
 Nakajima Type P.E.: simplified prototype with a fixed landing gear and a radial engine

Specifications (Ki-12)

See also

References
Notes

Bibliography

External links
 Pacific Storm on development of Nakajima fighters 

Low-wing aircraft
Ki-12, Nakajima
1930s Japanese experimental aircraft
Abandoned military aircraft projects of Japan
Ki-012
Single-engined tractor aircraft
Aircraft first flown in 1936